Doran may refer to:

People 
 Abbas Doran (1950–1982d), Iranian IRIAF fighter pilot 
 Ann Doran (1911–2000), American character actress
 Beauchamp Doran (1860–1943), British Army officer during the First World War
 Bill Doran (disambiguation)
 Charles Guilfoyle Doran (1835–1909), Irish leading figure in the Irish Republican Brotherhood (IRB) and the Fenian Brotherhood 
 Chris Doran (born 1979), Irish singer
 Colleen Doran, American writer-artist and cartoonist
 Daryl Doran (born 1963), U.S. indoor soccer player.
 Frank Doran (disambiguation)
 Gerry Doran (1877–1943), Irish rugby union international
 Henrietta Doran-York (born 1962), Sint Maartener politician
 Jamie Doran, Irish-Scottish independent documentary filmmaker 
 John Doran (disambiguation)
 John James Doran (1864–1904), Boatswain's Mate, 2nd Class in the United States Navy during the Spanish–American War
 Juno Doran, British visual and sound artist
 Kelly Doran (born 1957), American businessman and politician
 Kevin Doran (born 1953), Irish prelate and bishop of the Catholic Church 
 Luke Doran (born 1991), Australian cricketer
 Madeleine Doran (1905–1996), American literary critic and poet 
 Matt Doran (born 1976), Australian actor
 Michael Doran (disambiguation)
 Mildred Doran (1905–1927), American aviator
 Robert Doran (disambiguation)
 Steve Doran, English community organiser, activist and former radio DJ
 Thomas G. Doran (1936–2016), American prelate of the Catholic Church, Roman Catholic bishop
 Tony Doran (born 1946), Irish retired hurler 
 W. J. Doran (1886–1949), American politician, Missouri senator
 Walter Doran (born 1945), admiral in the United States Navy
 William Doran (1834–1903), Canadian mayor of Hamilton, Ontario 
 William C. Doran (1884–1965), American associate justice of the California Court of Appeal

Places 
 Doran, Kerman, Iran
 Doran, Minnesota, USA
 Doran Regional Park, Sonoma County, California, USA
 Ben Doran, mountain in Scotland

Ships 
 , Wickes-class destroyer
 , Gleaves-class destroyer

Fictional characters 
 Vala Mal Doran, Stargate SG-1 character

English-language surnames
Anglicised Irish-language surnames
Surnames of Irish origin